is a railway station in the city of Gamagōri, Aichi Prefecture, Japan, operated by Meitetsu.

Lines

Station layout
The station has one side platform connected to a single bi-directional track. The station is staffed. While this station is only operated by Meitetsu, it is physically connected to JR Central Mikawa-Shiotsu Station on the Tōkaidō Main Line by a footbridge.

Adjacent stations

|-
!colspan=5|Nagoya Railroad

Station history
The station was renamed to its present name on October 1, 1968.

Surrounding area
 Aichi University of Technology
Gamagōri Kyōtei Course, or Gamagōri Boat Race Course.

See also
 List of Railway Stations in Japan

External links

 Official web page

Railway stations in Japan opened in 1936
Railway stations in Aichi Prefecture
Stations of Nagoya Railroad
Gamagōri, Aichi